Sven Ulreich (born 3 August 1988) is a German professional footballer who plays as a goalkeeper for Bundesliga club Bayern Munich.

Club career

VfB Stuttgart
He was Stuttgart II's first-choice goalkeeper during their first four matches of the 2007–08 Regionalliga season, keeping two clean sheets in that period. He played 10 matches during the previous season, receiving two yellow cards.

In January 2008, he was promoted to the first team of VfB Stuttgart. But he also played again for the reserve team. He made his first team debut on 9 February 2008, in the 3–1 loss to Hertha BSC and earned his first victory as the starting goalkeeper on 16 February 2008, against MSV Duisburg.

On 6 April 2010, Ulreich extended his contract at VfB Stuttgart until the summer of 2013. On 20 January 2012 he extended his contract until June 2017.

For the 2015–16 season, Ulreich moved to Bayern Munich. He had been at Stuttgart since 1998.

Bayern Munich

Ulreich transferred to Bayern prior to the 2015–16 season and signed a contract until 2018. He was on the substitutes' bench for the 2015 DFL-Supercup. He finished the 2015–16 season with three appearances. He finished the 2016–17 season with seven appearances.

He was able to feature regularly for Bayern Munich during the 2017–18 season, due to a long-term injury to first-choice goalkeeper Manuel Neuer. Ulreich started the 2017–18 season by playing in the German Super Cup. Ulreich played a key role in guiding Bayern Munich to a record sixth successive German Bundesliga title, which was confirmed in a 1–4 win away at FC Augsburg on 7 April 2018. However, Bayern Munich were eliminated from 2017–18 Champions League partly due to a goalkeeping error by Ulreich against Real Madrid in semi-finals. Bayern lost 4–3 on aggregate. In total, he made 47 appearances in the 2017–18 season.

Hamburger SV
After Bayern had signed another goalkeeper in the form of Alexander Nübel in the summer of 2020 amidst much public interest, discussions arose as to who would be the backup behind Manuel Neuer in the future. Ulreich therefore moved to 2. Bundesliga club Hamburger SV in early October 2020 shortly before the end of the transfer window, signing a three-year contract. There, the 32-year-old immediately took over as the starter instead of Daniel Heuer Fernandes under new head coach Daniel Thioune.

On 4 June 2021, Ulreich's contract with HSV was terminated prematurely.

Return to Bayern Munich 
On 27 June 2021, Ulreich returned to Bayern Munich. On 11 November 2022, he extended his contract with Bayern until 2024.

International career

Ulreich was also a member of the Germany U16, Germany U19,  Germany U21 teams and received a call-up for the senior team.

Career statistics 

1.Includes German Cup.
2.Includes UEFA Champions League and UEFA Cup/Europa League.
3.Includes German Super Cup.

Honours

Bayern Munich
 Bundesliga: 2015–16, 2016–17, 2017–18, 2018–19, 2019–20, 2021–22
 DFB-Pokal: 2015–16, 2018–19, 2019–20
 DFL-Supercup: 2016, 2017, 2018, 2021, 2022
 UEFA Champions League: 2019–20
 UEFA Super Cup: 2020
Individual
 Bayern Munich Player of the Season: 2017–18

References

External links
 Profile at the FC Bayern Munich website
 
 

1988 births
Living people
People from Schorndorf
Sportspeople from Stuttgart (region)
Footballers from Baden-Württemberg
German footballers
Association football goalkeepers
VfB Stuttgart players
VfB Stuttgart II players
FC Bayern Munich footballers
Hamburger SV players
Bundesliga players
2. Bundesliga players
3. Liga players
UEFA Champions League winning players
Germany under-21 international footballers